In the 1983–84 season, the Tercera División – the fourth tier of professional football in Spain – was organised in fourteen regional groups. The best performing teams in each group went into a two-round promotion playoff, from which six teams were promoted to the Segunda División B.

League tables

Group I

Group II

Group III

Group IV

Group V

Group VI

Group VII

Group VIII

Group IX

Group X

Group XI

Group XII

Group XIII

Group XIV

Promotion playoff

First round

Final Round

Season records
 Most wins: 30, Alzira.
 Most draws: 17, Chiclana.
 Most losses: 30, Motril.
 Most goals for: 111, Burgos.
 Most goals against: 117, Huercalense.
 Most points: 66, Alzira.
 Fewest wins: 2, Recreativo de Bailén and Lucentino Industrial.
 Fewest draws: 3, 5 teams.
 Fewest losses: 1, Santurtzi.
 Fewest goals for: 22, Eume and Recreativo de Bailén.
 Fewest goals against: 15, Pontevedra, Levante and Plasencia.
 Fewest points: 10, Motril.

Notes

External links
www.rsssf.com
www.futbolme.com

Tercera División seasons
4
Spain